Cristian O'Brien (born 15 January 1974) is a former Australian rules footballer who played with Geelong in the Australian Football League (AFL).

O'Brien played his junior football for Mordialloc-Braeside, from where he was drafted by Melbourne. A forward, he appeared for Melbourne at under-19s and reserves level, but didn't play a senior AFL game. He spent some time with Norwood, before returning to the league in 1993, when Geelong selected him in the Mid-Season Draft. Geelong made the grand final in each of his two senior seasons, 1994 and 1995. He appeared once each year, in round 11 of the 1994 AFL season against the Brisbane Bears and the opening round of the 1995 AFL season against Melbourne, both at Kardinia Park.

References

1974 births
Australian rules footballers from Victoria (Australia)
Geelong Football Club players
Norwood Football Club players
Living people